Chalk Circle may refer to:

The Chalk Circle, a Chinese play
The Augsburg Chalk Circle, a German short story
The Caucasian Chalk Circle, a German play
Der Kreidekreis (The Chalk Circle), a German play by Klabund
Der Kreidekreis (opera), an opera by Alexander von Zemlinsky after the play by Klabund
Chalk Circle (Canadian band), a Canadian alternative rock band
Chalk Circle (American band), an American punk rock band